Browallia is a small genus of seven species of flowering plants (mostly annuals though occasionally shrubs or ephemerophytes) belonging to the nightshade family Solanaceae. It is named after Johannes Browallius (1707–1755), also known as Johan Browall, a Swedish botanist, physician and bishop. The genus is closely related to the monotypic genus Streptosolen, the single species of which was published initially under the name Browallia jamesonii.

Browallia species are found from southern Arizona in the north, southward through Mexico, Central America and the Antilles to andine South America, reaching as far south as Bolivia.

Species
'At least 17 binomials,at the specific level,have been proposed for this difficult genus; no doubt that a critical sound treatment is badly needed to clarify its obscure taxonomy' - Armando Hunziker (2001)
 Browallia abbreviata Benth.
 Browallia acutiloba A.S. Alva & O.D. Carranza
 Browallia americana L. - Jamaican forget-me-not
 Browallia dilloniana Limo, K. Lezama & S. Leiva
 Browallia eludens R.K.VanDevender & P.D.Jenkins - Arizona/yellow bush-violet
 Browallia mirabilis S. Leiva
 Browallia speciosa Hook. - Amethyst flower or bush-violet

Use in Colombian folk medicine
The Ingano of Mocoa in the Colombian department of Putumayo chew the leaves of Browallia speciosa to a pulp and pack the resultant material around decaying molars to alleviate the pain of toothache.

Gallery

References

Further reading
 

Cestroideae
Solanaceae genera